Feed the Fire is the debut mixtape by American singer and actor Samuel Mancini. It was released on February 26, 2021, by Eric West Management Group.

On March 13, 2021, Feed the Fire entered at number 58 on the Billboard Top Current Album Sales chart, becoming the number-one selling mixtape of the week in the U.S., also helping Mancini enter Billboards Top Emerging Artists Chart at number 44 the same week. The mixtape re-entered various Billboard charts in November 2021, following the reissue of the mixtape as a "Deluxe Red Edition" with four additional tracks.

Commercial performance
Feed the Fire debuted at number 58 on the Billboard Top Current Album Sales chart in the week ending March 13, 2021. Following the reissue of the Deluxe Red Edition of Feed the Fire released on October 22, 2021, the mixtape debuted at number 21 on the Billboard Top Heatseekers chart, number 54 on the Top Album Sales and re-entered the Billboard Top Current Album Sales at number 36 in the week ending November 6, 2021.

Track listing

Personnel
Credits adapted from AllMusic.

Musicians
 Samuel Mancini – vocals
 Abby Jury – backing vocals
 Peter Leonardo – drums
 Al Torrence – backing vocals

Production
 Cody Alushin – design
 Alvy – production, mixing
 Dakora Calvett – photography
 Freelance – producer
 Daniel Fusco – production, mixing
 Chris Gehringer – mastering
 Timothy Mancini – photography
 Tressmon Scott – production, photography
 Al Torrence – production, mixing
 Eric West – producer, executive producer
 Kerim Wilhelm – production, mixing

Charts

References

2021 mixtape albums